Together Again: Live at the Montreux Jazz Festival '82 is a live album by American jazz group the Modern Jazz Quartet featuring performances recorded at the Montreux Jazz Festival in 1982 and released on the Pablo label.

Reception
The Allmusic review stated "the band still had its enthusiasm and the ability to make the veteran material sound fresh and swinging".

Track listing
All compositions by John Lewis except as indicated
 "Django" - 5:47    
 "The Cylinder" (Milt Jackson) - 5:18    
 "The Martyr" (Jackson) - 8:43    
 "Really True Blues" (Jackson) - 5:39    
 "Odds Against Tomorrow" - 8:53    
 "The Jasmine Tree" - 4:42    
 "Monterey Mist" (Jackson) - 4:05    
 "Bags' New Groove" (Jackson) - 4:15    
 "Woody 'n' You" (Dizzy Gillespie) - 3:47

Personnel
Milt Jackson - vibraphone
John Lewis - piano
Percy Heath - bass
Connie Kay - drums

References

Pablo Records live albums
Modern Jazz Quartet live albums
1982 live albums
Albums recorded at the Montreux Jazz Festival
Albums produced by Norman Granz